The 2017 season was SCG Muangthong United's 9th season in the Thai League T1 since 2009.

Thailand Champions Cup

The 2017 Thailand Champions Cup. It features SCG Muangthong United the winners of the 2016 Thai League and Sukhothai the winners of the 2016 Thai FA Cup. It features at Supachalasai Stadium.

Toyota Premier Cup

The 2017 Toyota Premier Cup. It features SCG Muangthong United the winners of the 2016 Thai League Cup and Sanfrecce Hiroshima as an invited team from the 2016 J1 League (Japan). It features at Supachalasai Stadium. It is sponsored by Toyota Motor (Thailand) Co., Ltd.

Thai League

Thai FA Cup

Thai League Cup

Mekong Club Championship

AFC Champions League

Group stage

Knockout phase

Squad appearances statistics

Squad goals statistics

Transfers
First Thai footballer's market is opening on December 14, 2016 to January 28, 2017
Second Thai footballer's market is opening on June 3, 2017 to June 30, 2017

In

Out

Loan in

Loan out

Notes

References

External links
 SCG Muangthong United F.C. Official Website 
 Thai League Official Website

MTU
2017